Antiesen is a river of Upper Austria and a right tributary of the Inn. It flows into the Inn near Antiesenhofen.

References

Rivers of Upper Austria
Rivers of Austria